Marina Vidović (born 13 September 1973) is a Yugoslav alpine skier. She competed in four events at the 1992 Winter Olympics.

References

1973 births
Living people
Yugoslav female alpine skiers
Olympic alpine skiers of Yugoslavia
Alpine skiers at the 1992 Winter Olympics
Place of birth missing (living people)